Sheriff Stadium (also known as Glavnaya Arena of Complexul Sheriif) is home to Sheriff Tiraspol, a football team based in Tiraspol, capital of Transnistria breakaway region of Moldova. It is owned by the local Sheriff corporation. It has a capacity of 12,746. 

It occupies a territory of more than 40 hectares and consists of the main field plus five other fields, training fields, a covered indoor arena for winter use as well as a soccer school for children and on-site residences for the players of FC Sheriff. A five star luxury hotel is under construction.

In June 2022, UEFA ordered that no European games would be permitted to be played in Transnistria, as a direct consequence of the 2022 Russian invasion of Ukraine. Sheriff played all of their home fixtures in the 2022-23 UEFA Europa League and 2022-23 UEFA Europa Conference League at Zimbru Stadium in Chișinău.

See also 
 Malaya Sportivnaya Arena
 Sheriff (company)

References

External links 

 Official Stadium website (in Russian, English, Romanian)

Football venues in Moldova
Economy of Transnistria
Football venues in Transnistria
Tiraspol
FC Sheriff Tiraspol
2002 establishments in Moldova
Sports venues completed in 2002